Monoloog in Stereo (Monologue in Stereo) is a 6-track EP by South African punk rock band Fokofpolisiekar, released in 2005. The album has a playtime of 23:18.

Unlike the band's previous releases, Monoloog in Stereo doesn't contain any obscenities in the lyrics. The anger, which was readily available in previous albums, was also toned down and replaced by sung, not screamed, lyrics which reflect the sadness of the South African youth who live with no future and a detestable past.

Track listing 

2005 EPs
Fokofpolisiekar albums